Marie Dorothée Louise de Talleyrand-Périgord (17 November 1862 – 17 July 1948) was a French aristocrat most notable for her salons and her role in European high-society in the late 19th and early 20th centuries. Known as "Dolly" to her friends, she inspired artists and writers including Marcel Proust. She was the half-sister of the prince de Sagan, who had dual French and Prussian nationality and sat in the Prussian House of Lords.

Biography
A daughter of Napoléon-Louis de Talleyrand-Périgord (1811–1898), duc de Dino et de Talleyrand and Rachel Élisabeth Pauline de Castellane, she spent her childhood in her father's vast estates in Prussia, where even as a very small child accompanied him on wolf hunts. Her first marriage was to Hereditary Prince Charles Egon IV von und zu Fürstenberg, one-time lover of the courtesan Laure Hayman and son of hereditary prince Charles-Egon III and his wife Princess Elisabeth Reuss zu Greiz. Their marriage lasted 15 years, during which the princess was "one of the main ornaments of the [Prussian] court in Berlin". Her cousin Princess Marie Radziwill (1840–1915) also held a brilliant salon in Berlin. According to Princess Radziwill's nephew Boni de Castellane: 

She also lived in her palace in Donaueschingen. After her first husband's death, she remarried in 1898 to her cousin Count Jean de Castellane, son of Antoine de Castellane. According to George Painter, she inspired Proust to create the character of the young princess Guermantes, who was born a duchess in Bavaria and had a slight German accent. Intelligent and spiritual, she held a prestigious salon at the place des Saussaies in Paris, receiving Wilhelm II. She was nicknamed "Gräfin Jean" (countess Jean) and André Germain said that:
 
whilst André de Fouquières stated she:

She was disliked by her rival, the Elisabeth, Countess Greffulhe. In the inter-war period, her salon was also frequented by several politicians, most notably Georges Leygues.

References

Bibliography 
 André Germain, Les Clés de Proust, Paris, éditions Sun, 1953
 George D. Painter, Marcel Proust, Paris, Mercure de France, 1966, 2de édition 1992

1862 births
1948 deaths
Dorothee de Talleyrand-Perigord
French princesses
French countesses
French salon-holders
Dorothee